Deh Tut may refer to:
 Deh Tut, Chaharmahal and Bakhtiari
 Deh Tut, Kermanshah
 Deh Tut, Kohgiluyeh and Boyer-Ahmad